Erik Fisher (born March 21, 1985) is a World Cup alpine ski racer with the U.S. Ski Team. From Middleton, Idaho, he primarily competes in the speed events of Downhill and Super G.

Born in Ontario, Oregon, Fisher learned to ski and race at Bogus Basin near Boise, Idaho, beginning at age 3.  While growing up, his family moved to different locations in the western U.S.; he also raced in northern Arizona and Utah before returning to Idaho as a teenager. Following graduation from Eagle High School in 2003, Fisher spent a post-graduate year at the Rowmark ski academy in Salt Lake City, and was named to the national developmental team in 2004. He was the bronze medalist in the downhill at the 2005 Junior World Championships in Bardonecchia, Italy.

Fisher made his World Cup debut in November 2005 in a downhill at Lake Louise, Alberta, and finished 44th. An ACL injury in November 2007 kept him out of the rest of the 2008 season. He returned the following season in 2009 and had his best results with a seventh at Val Gardena, Italy, and an 11th at the famed Hahnenkamm downhill race in Kitzbühel, Austria.

Fisher qualified for the U.S. team for the 2010 Winter Olympics in late 2009, but did not race in February due to a broken hand.

Fisher is a member of the Church of Jesus Christ of Latter-day Saints.

World Cup top twenty finishes

References

External links
 
 Erik Fisher World Cup standings at the International Ski Federation
 
 Erik Fisher at the U.S. Ski Team
 Official website
 Erik Fisher at Fischer Skis
 The Ski Channel's Q&A with Erik - The Ski Channel sat down with Erik to learn more about "The Flying Fish."
 Skodeo.com

American male alpine skiers
People from Ontario, Oregon
People from Middleton, Idaho
1985 births
Living people
Latter Day Saints from Idaho
Latter Day Saints from Oregon